Milano Koenders (born 31 July 1986) is a Dutch footballer who plays as a centre-back or as a right-back for Tweede Klasse club DWS. Koenders also runs his own football school.

Club career
Koenders is a defender who was born in Amsterdam. He began his career at SDZ before joining the Ajax youth department in 1996. He left Ajax after ten years, in 2006.

Koenders then joined to RKC Waalwijk and made his debut in the professional football in the 2006–07 season, playing 30 matches. After one year, he left the club in 2007, and moved to AZ Alkmaar. There, he would make his European debut as a starter in a 1–1 away draw in the group stage of the UEFA Cup against Zenit Saint Petersburg. In January 2009, he was loaned out to NEC. AZ went on to win the 2008–09 Eredivisie in his absence.

He was once again loaned out in early 2010, this time to Sparta Rotterdam. In the summer of 2010, he signed another loan contract, now at NAC Breda. In 2016, he opened his own football school after being inspired by fellow footballer Nordin Wooter.

In summer 2016, Koenders joined Romanian club Concordia Chiajna for the 2016–17 season. 

In May 2019 it was confirmed, that DWS would collaborate with the football school of Koenders. One month later, in June, DWS announced that Koenders also would be playing for the club.

International career
Born in the Netherlands, Koenders is of Surinamese descent. Koenders was member of the Netherlands U21s and played his first game on 14 November 2006 against England U21. 

Koenders also represented Suriname in two unofficial matches against W Connection and Curaçao national football team, captaining the team on both occasions.

Career statistics

Honours
AZ Alkmaar
 Eredivisie: 2008–09

References

External links
 
 
 
 Milano Koenders at Voetbal International 

1986 births
Living people
Association football central defenders
Association football fullbacks
Dutch footballers
Footballers from Amsterdam
Netherlands youth international footballers
Netherlands under-21 international footballers
Dutch sportspeople of Surinamese descent
Eredivisie players
Liga I players
RKC Waalwijk players
AZ Alkmaar players
NEC Nijmegen players
NAC Breda players
Heracles Almelo players
CS Concordia Chiajna players
Dutch expatriate footballers
Expatriate footballers in Romania
Dutch expatriate sportspeople in Romania